Wayne Larkin (November 10, 1938 in Winnipeg, Manitoba – September 13, 1968) was a Canadian ice hockey left winger.

Larkin played eight seasons in the American Hockey League for the Cleveland Barons, Springfield Indians, Providence Reds and the Buffalo Bisons.  He also played in the Western Hockey League for the Winnipeg Warriors and the Vancouver Canucks and in the International Hockey League for the St. Paul Saints.

Awards and achievements
Turnbull Cup MJHL Championship (1959)
Memorial Cup Championship (1959)
"Honoured Member" of the Manitoba Hockey Hall of Fame

See also
 List of ice hockey players who died during their playing career

External links

Wayne Larkin's biography at Manitoba Hockey Hall of Fame

1938 births
1968 deaths
Buffalo Bisons (AHL) players
Canadian ice hockey left wingers
Cleveland Barons (1937–1973) players
Winnipeg Braves players
Providence Reds players
Springfield Indians players
Vancouver Canucks (WHL) players
Winnipeg Warriors (minor pro) players
Ice hockey people from Winnipeg